The Horse Latitudes is an EP by the emo band The Promise Ring. It was released in 1997 on Jade Tree Records. The album was released between their debut album 30° Everywhere and their hit record Nothing Feels Good.

Track listing

Tracks 1-2 originally released on the Watertown Plank 7"
Tracks 3-5 originally released on the Falsetto Keeps Time 7"
Track 6 originally on The Promise Ring/Texas is the Reason Split 7"
Tracks 7-8 never before released

Personnel
Davey von Bohlen – vocals, guitar
Jason Gnewikow – guitar
Scott Beschta – bass guitar
Dan Didier – drums

References

External links

The Horse Latitudes at YouTube (streamed copy where licensed)

The Promise Ring albums
1997 compilation albums
1997 EPs
Jade Tree (record label) EPs